Corangamite may refer to:
Division of Corangamite
Lake Corangamite
Corangamite Shire
Corangamite Catchment Management Authority